Frasnes-lez-Gosselies is a village of Wallonia and a district of the municipality of Les Bons Villers, located in the province of Hainaut, Belgium.

Former names 
Fraxina (1146 ; 1147 ; 1148), Frasna (1148), Fraine (1205 ; ±1210), Fraxinensis (1205), Fraina (1222).

Notable natives of Frasnes-lez-Gosselies 

Adolphe Biarent (1871–1916), composer
Paul Vanderborght (1899–1971), poet
Jean Duvieusart (1900–1977), Former Prime Minister

References

Former municipalities of Hainaut (province)